Zuberec is a village in northern Slovakia and a popular tourist center at the foothills of the Western Tatras. Zuberec features numerous accommodation facilities, restaurants, museum and a tourist information office.

The village is the place of several cultural and sporting events including Podroháčske folklórne slávnosti (folk festival), Goralský klobúčik (alpine skiing), Oravaman (triathlon) and WSA Eurocup Zuberec (dogsled racing).

Name 
Zuberec is called Zuberzec in Polish and Bölényfalu in Hungarian. It is named after the European bison, an animal that used to be abundant in the region at the time of the foundation of the village.

History 

Zuberec was founded in 1593, when the village was known as Zwberczyc, by shepherds and farmers under Vlach colonization law Lex Antiqua Valachorum. It was subordinate, like the surrounding villages, to the Orava Castle. The village ceased to exist because of the Bocskay uprising, but it was later re-colonized. In 1683 it was devastated by the soldiers of the Polish–Lithuanian Commonwealth.

Zuberec contains the neo-gothic Church of Saint Vendelin built in the 1930s according to project of Milan Michal Harminec. At that time, Zuberec did not contain a church and there were space issues in the church in nearby village Habovka. Its founding stone was laid down in 1929 and the church was consecrated in 1933 by the catholic priest Andrej Hlinka. There are relics of Saint Vendelin housed here. There is a stone cross in front of the church from the year 1839.  Local cemetery contains gravestones featuring folklore stone reliefs from the end of the 19th century.

Geography 
Zuberec is situated in the Tvrdošín District of the Žilina Region. Historically, it was part of the Orava region. The village lies at an altitude of 760 metres, under the Roháče mountains. The municipality covers an area of 72.328km².

Demographics 
Zuberec has a population of 1,810 (as of December 31, 2005). According to the 2001 census, 99.6% of inhabitants were Slovaks and 97.6% Roman Catholics.

Open-air museum 

The Museum of the Orava Village is located in Zuberec. This open-air museum of folk architecture exhibits intact rural houses brought from all around the region of Orava and re-assembled in Zuberec. The oldest building, a Gothic wooden church, was constructed in the 15th century, but the museum itself was founded in 1967. In addition to the church, it now also has its own graveyard and a functioning watermill. The interior of the buildings hosts an ethnographic collection. The gardens and fields around the houses show various ancient forms of farming and animal husbandry.

Skiing
Zuberec has three ski resorts: Zuberec Janovky, Zuberec Milotín, and Zverovka Spálená.

See also 
 Tatra mountains
 Orava Highlands

References

External links
 Official Zuberec website
 Open-air Museum of Orava Village in pictures

Ski areas and resorts in Slovakia
Villages and municipalities in Tvrdošín District